Volodymyr Malanczuk, C.Ss.R. (20 August 1904 – 29 September 1990) was a Ukrainian Greek Catholic hierarch in France. He was the first Apostolic Exarch of the new created Apostolic Exarchat of France as titular bishop of Epiphania in Syria from 1960 to 1982.

Biography
Born in Bazar, Austro-Hungarian Empire (present day – Ternopil Oblast, Ukraine) in the Ukrainian peasant family in 1904. He professed as Redemptorist on 21 September 1925 and was ordained a priest on 26 April 1931 by Metropolitan Andrey Sheptytsky. He worked as Vicar General for the Ukrainians in the United Kingdom from 1949 to 1951 and as Provincial Superior of the Ukrainian Redemptorists in Canada from 1951 to 1961.

He was appointed by the Holy See an Apostolic Exarch of the new created Apostolic Exarchat of France for the Ukrainians on 22 July 1960. He was consecrated to the Episcopate on 19 February 1961. The principal consecrator was Archbishop Maxim Hermaniuk, and the principal co-consecrators were Bishop Ambrose Senyshyn and Bishop Isidore Borecky in Winnipeg, Manitoba. Bishop Malanczuk retired on 27 November 1982.

He participated in the Second Vatican Council as a Council Father in 1960th. He died in Winnipeg on 29 September 1990.

References 

1904 births
1990 deaths
People from Ternopil Oblast
Ukrainian Austro-Hungarians
People from the Kingdom of Galicia and Lodomeria
20th-century Eastern Catholic bishops
Bishops of the Ukrainian Greek Catholic Church
French people of Ukrainian descent
Redemptorist bishops
Participants in the Second Vatican Council
20th-century Roman Catholic bishops in France